11.6 is a 2013 French film directed by Philippe Godeau and starring François Cluzet, Bouli Lanners, Corinne Masiero and Juana Acosta. 11.6 premiered on 3 April 2013 in France, and on 21 April in North America, at the City of Lights, City of Angels film festival.

Plot
Based on Alice Géraud-Arfi's book Toni 11,6 : Histoire du convoyeur, the film tells the real-life story of criminal Toni Musulin, who pulls off one of the largest heists in France's history without the aid of firearms.

Cast 
 François Cluzet as Toni Musulin
 Bouli Lanners as Arnaud
 Corinne Masiero as Marion
 Juana Acosta as Natalia
 Johan Libéreau as Viktor
 Mireille Franchino as Svetlana
  as IBRIS intendant
  as Lepoivron
 Eric Bernard as Nabil
  as Bruno Morales
  as Arbouche 
 Mohamed Makhtoumi as Diego
 Christelle Bornuat as Christelle
  as the Captain
 Mehdi Nebbou as Monegasque police officer
 Fabienne Luchetti as police chief

Reception
11.6 has grossed $2.5 million in worldwide theatrical box office, against a production budget of $9.5 million. Bouli Lanners received a nomination for Best Supporting Actor at the 4th Magritte Awards.

References

External links

2013 crime thriller films
2013 films
French crime thriller films
2010s French-language films
French heist films
Biographical films about French gangsters
Pan-Européenne films
Films set in Lyon
2010s heist films
2010s French films